Trice may refer to:
 Human names:
 Trice (surname) 
 Trice Harvey (1936–2017), American politician
 TrICE, cosmic ray telescope with formal name Track Imaging Cherenkov Experiment 
 Trice (trimaran), innovative sailboat